James Czajkowski may refer to:
 James Rollins, real name Jim Czajkowski, American author
 Jim Czajkowski, American baseball player

See also
Czajkowski (surname)